Transformers: Robots in Disguise may refer to the following entries in the Transformers media franchise:

Part of the lyrics of the theme song to the 1984 TV series The Transformers
Transformers: Robots in Disguise (2000 TV series), Japanese anime television series
Transformers: Robots in Disguise (2015 TV series), American animated television series

See also
Robots in Disguise, an English electropunk band